The 45th FIE Fencing World Cup began in October 2015 and concluded in August 2016 at the 2016 Summer Olympics held in Rio de Janeiro. The International Fencing Federation being allocated only ten events by the International Olympic Committee, as opposed to twelve in major fencing competitions, two team events – in this case, women's team foil and men's team sabre — will be disputed as World Championships, held in Rio in April 2016. They also serve as test event for the organisation of the Olympic events.

Individual épée

Top 10

Men's épée

Women's épée

Individual foil

Top 10

Men's foil

Women's foil

Individual sabre

Top 10

Men's sabre

Women's sabre

Team épée

Top 10

Men's team épée

Women's team épée

Team foil

Top 10

Men's team foil

Women's team foil

Team sabre

Top 10

Men's team sabre

Women's team sabre

References 

 
 

Fencing World Cup
2015 in fencing
2016 in fencing
International fencing competitions hosted by Brazil
2016 in Brazilian sport
Fencing